2004 in professional wrestling describes the year's events in the world of professional wrestling.

List of notable promotions 
These promotions held notable shows in 2004.

Calendar of notable shows

January

February

March

April

May

June

July

August

September

October

November

December

Accomplishments and tournaments

AAA

Ring of Honor

TNA

TNA Year End Awards

WWE

WWE Hall of Fame

Awards and honors

Pro Wrestling Illustrated

Wrestling Observer Newsletter

Wrestling Observer Newsletter Hall of Fame

Wrestling Observer Newsletter awards

Title changes

NJPW

WWE 
 – Raw
 – SmackDown

Raw and SmackDown each had a world championship, a secondary championship, and a tag team championship for male wrestlers. SmackDown also had a title for their cruiserweight wrestlers. There was only one women's championship and it was exclusive to Raw.

Debuts

Uncertain debut date
Christy Hemme
Maria Kanellis
Mecha Wolf 450
Carmella DeCesare
 March 27 – Adrian Neville
 June – Dean Ambrose/Jon Moxley
 June 16 
 Asuka (wrestler)
 Cherry
 July 1 - Kota Ibushi
 July 4 - Q. T. Marshall
 July 26 - Yujiro Takahashi
 August 8 – Matt Jackson
 August 8 – Nick Jackson
 August 29 – Kazuchika Okada
 October 13 – Choun Shiryu
 November 15 – Candice Michelle
 November 18 – Michelle McCool
 December 4 – Guts Ishijima

Retirements
 Randy Savage (1973–December 5, 2004)
 Ángel Acevedo (1973-2004, returned for one match in 2017)
 Timothy Well (1987–2004)
 Dances With Dudley (1992-2004) 
 Carmella DeCesare (October-November 2004)
 Shaniqua (2002–February 2004)
 Ron Simmons (1986-March 2004) (returned to wrestling in 2006 and retired in 2012) 
 John Tenta (1987-2004) 
 Terri Runnels (1990 – April 2004)
 Sable (1996 – August 10, 2004)
 The Fabulous Moolah (1949–September 21, 2004)

Births 
August 11 - Hanan

Deaths 

 January 24 – Jack Tunney, 69
 January 27 - Hard Boiled Haggerty, 78
 March 6 – Hercules, 47
 March 11 - Michael Okpala, 64
 May 6 - Pepper Gomez, 77
 June 1 – James Dudley, 94
 August 25 - Dave Levin, 91 
 September 12 - Dr. Wagner, 68 
 September 18 - Jim Barnett, 90
 September 22 – Big Boss Man, 41
 September 26 – Marianna Komlos, 35

See also
List of WWE pay-per-view events
List of TNA pay-per-view events

References

 
professional wrestling